The Malaysia women's national football team represents Malaysia in international women's association football; it is controlled by the Football Association of Malaysia (FAM). Despite football being one of the nation's favorite sports, Malaysia is not among the strongest teams in the AFC, especially its women's side. Women's football in Malaysia is considerably underdeveloped, mostly due to the strict principles of Islam, the country's most dominant religion, in contrast with the men's side.

History
In 2005, the team was one of seven that included Brunei, Thailand, Indonesia, Timor-Leste, Cambodia, Laos, Vietnam, Myanmar and Singapore, that were expected to field a women's football team to compete at that year's SEA Games in the Philippines.

New era
Consequently, FAM has planned to set up the first women football league in Malaysia. It is planned to be named Women Division 1 and Women Super League.

Team image

Nicknames
The Malaysia women's national football team has been known or nicknamed as the "Harimau Malaya (Malayan Tigers)" or Skuad Kebangsaan (National Team)".

Kits and crest
The logo symbolises the unity and forward progress of Malaysian football. Composed of four main elements, the logo stands for the development and awareness of the international image and patriotism of the sport in Malaysia. The Malayan tiger leaping over a football is the main element of the logo, and symbolises the courage and dignity portrayed while playing the game. The paddy stalks represent the prosperity and wealth of Malaysia, and the development of football in the country from the grassroots level. The Malay kris that rests at the top represents nationalism, and awareness that represents Malaysia at every level of football. The entire emblem is enclosed within a circle that represents the unity and timelessness of the sport.

Kit suppliers
Similar to the men's team, the national team kit was manufactured by Adidas from the 1970s, who also sponsored the national team kit. Since 2007, the official Malaysia team kit has been manufactured by Nike. The home kit's design of black and yellow stripes is a throwback to the kit used by the Malaysian national team of the 1920s. The great national team of the 1970s also sported similar stripes, which are supposed to be reminiscent of the stripes of a tiger, the symbol of Malaysia's national football team. Since November 2010, Nike Malaysia has replaced Adidas as the team kit sponsor.

Home stadium
The Malaysia plays their home matches on the Bukit Jalil National Stadium.

Supporters
Ultras Malaya is the name of the major supporters for the national team in West Malaysia. They are known for their high fanaticism and support towards the national team. In every international match the national team played, a group standing at the supporters area can be found. The main colours of the supporters are usually black with a yellow scarf and banners just like the national team kits colours. These supporters always bring flares, drums and large national flags to the stadiums.

Sponsors
According to the website of Football Association of Malaysia, Malaysia main sponsors include Nike, Bank Islam, 100plus, Telekom Malaysia and One Goal.

Results and fixtures

The following is a list of match results in the last 12 months, as well as any future matches that have been scheduled.

Legend

2022

Coaching staff

Current coaching staff
Below is the registered officials for the Malaysia Women's Team.

Players

Current squad
The following players have been called up for the 2022 AFC Women's Asian Cup qualification phase.

Recent call ups
 The following players have been called up to a Malaysia squad in the past 12 months.

Competitive record
 Champions   Runners-up   Third place  
 Fourth place

FIFA Women's World Cup

*Draws include knockout matches decided on penalty kicks.

Olympic Games 

*Draws include knockout matches decided on penalty kicks.

AFC Women's Asian Cup

*Draws include knockout matches decided on penalty kicks.

Notes:
 Red border colour indicates tournament was held on home soil.

Asian Games

*Draws include knockout matches decided on penalty kicks.

AFF Women's Championship

*Draws include knockout matches decided on penalty kicks.

SEA Games

*Draws include knockout matches decided on penalty kicks.

Notes:
 Red border colour indicates tournament was held on home soil.
 These matches are not regarded as part of the national team's record, nor are caps awarded.

Honours and achievements

Continental

Regional

Summary

See also

 Sport in Malaysia
 Football in Malaysia
 Women's football in Malaysia
 Football Association of Malaysia
 Malaysia women's national football team
 Malaysia women's national football team results
 List of Malaysia women's international footballers
 Malaysia women's national under-20 football team
 Malaysia women's national under-17 football team
 Malaysia women's national futsal team
 Malaysia national football team

References

External links
 Official website

Asian women's national association football teams
F